Maurice Graham Sankey (9 February 1940 – 21 November 1965) was an Australian rules footballer who played with Carlton in the Victorian Football League (VFL).

Sankey was from Tasmania and played his early football at Latrobe. A ruckman, he participated in Carlton's 1959 Preliminary Final loss to Essendon in just his third VFL appearance. He would later, in 1962, get to play in a Grand Final but again it was in a losing team, with Essendon victors.

He became club vice-captain in 1964 and brought up his 100th league match the following season.

On 21 November 1965, Sankey was killed when his car was involved in a head-on collision near Wangaratta. He was buried in Springvale Cemetery.

Maurice Sankey was posthumously inducted into the Tasmanian Football Hall of Fame on 23 June 2018.

Notes

References

Maurie Sankey's profile at Blueseum

1940 births
1965 deaths
Australian rules footballers from Tasmania
Carlton Football Club players
Latrobe Football Club players
Road incident deaths in Victoria (Australia)